Streptomyces tremellae is a bacterium species from the genus of Streptomyces which has been isolated from the mushroom Tremella fuciformis from Gutian in China.

See also 
 List of Streptomyces species

References

External links
Type strain of Streptomyces tremellae at BacDive -  the Bacterial Diversity Metadatabase

tremellae
Bacteria described in 2016